Diclidophora is a genus of flatworms belonging to the family Diclidophoridae.

The genus has almost cosmopolitan distribution.

Species:

Diclidophora caudospina 
Diclidophora denticulata 
Diclidophora embiotocae 
Diclidophora esmarkii 
Diclidophora esmarkii 
Diclidophora indica 
Diclidophora luscae 
Diclidophora maccallumi 
Diclidophora merlangi 
Diclidophora micromesisti 
Diclidophora minor 
Diclidophora minuti 
Diclidophora morrhuae 
Diclidophora paddiforma 
Diclidophora pagelli 
Diclidophora palmata 
Diclidophora phycidis 
Diclidophora pollachii 
Diclidophora srivastavai

References

Diclidophoridae
Monogenea genera